is a Japanese actor and voice actor; he is well known for playing Takeo Saeki in The Grudge and Mamoru Satake in Zipang.

Filmography

Anime
Arcade Gamer Fubuki (TV) as Referee
Arknights: Prelude to Dawn (TV) as Ace
Assassination Classroom (TV) as Lovro Brovski
Ancient Girl's Frame (TV) as Alex Robinson
Bakugan Battle Brawlers: New Vestroia (TV) as Helios
Bakutsuri Bar Hunter (TV) as Hoojirō Samejima
Battle Programmer Shirase (TV) as Principal Miura (ep 15)
Beast Wars II (TV) as Megastorm/Gigastorm, Powerhug
Beyblade 2002 (TV) as Gideon
Black Blood Brothers (TV) as Mitaki Onezaki
Black Bullet (TV) as Shigetoku Tadashima
Bomberman Jetters (TV) as Daibon
Boruto: Naruto Next Generations as Master Kajiki
Beast Wars Neo (TV) as Rockbuster
Bermuda Triangle: Colorful Pastrale (TV) as Manta
Corrector Yui (TV) as Warwolf/Synchro
Death Note (TV) as Jack Neylon/Kal Snydar
Detroit Metal City (OVA) as The Capitalist Pig/Keisuke Nashimoto
Di Gi Charat Nyo (TV) as Kintarou Kumagaya
Di Gi Charat Summer Special as Paya Paya
Digimon Adventure 02 (TV) as Mushamon
Digimon Tamers (TV) as Allomon (5), Mushamon (10)
Digimon Frontier (TV) as Snimon
Digimon Adventure (2020 TV series) (TV) as Algomon, Gaossmon, Abbadomon
Drifting Dragons as Badakin
Fairy Tail (TV) as Jose Porla, Byro (Edolas), Byro Cracy, Atlas Flame, Geoffrey, Arlock and Yajeel
Fantastic Children (TV) as Radcliff (ep 1)
Freezing Vibration (TV) as Marks Spencer
Full Moon (TV) as Jim Franklin
Ghost Hunt (TV) as Matsuyama
Ginga Densetsu Weed (TV) as Akame; Narrator
Hatena Illusion (TV) as Jeeves Wodehouse
Heroic Age (TV) as Mobeedo Oz Mehelim
Houshin Engi (TV) as Bunchuu
Hozuki's Coolheadedness (TV) as Rurio
Hungry Heart: Wild Striker (TV) as Kazuo Murakami
Hunter × Hunter (1999) (TV) as Geretta, Gotoh, Nobunaga Hazama
Hunter × Hunter (OVA) as Nobunaga Hazama
Hunter × Hunter (2011) (TV) as Johness The Dissector 
Jigoku Shōjo Futakomori (TV) as Kihachi Kusumi (ep 13)
Jubei-chan - Secret of the Lovely Eyepatch (TV) as Daigo Ryujoji/Taiko Daiyu
Katekyo Hitman Reborn! (TV) as Yamamoto's dad
Kodocha (TV) as Mr. Hayama; Nakao's father
Kyo Kara Maoh! (TV) as Dakaskos
Lance N' Masques (TV) as Gai Kongouji
Leave it to Piyoko! (OAV) as Bug
Legendz: Yomigaeru Ryuuou Densetsu (TV) as President
Les Misérables: Shōjo Cosette (TV) as Javert
Monsuno (TV) as Petro
Mōretsu Pirates (TV) as Oyaji-san
Mouse (TV) as Audio Transmission 1 (Ep 2); One (Ep 9-12)
Mushishi (TV) as Father (ep 7)
Muteking the Dancing Hero (TV) as Tommy
Nanaka 6/17 (TV) as Taizou Kirisato
Natsume's Book of Friends as One-Eyed Middle Class Yokai, Umpire Youkai
Nobunaga Concerto as Hachisuka Masakatsu
Ojarumaru (TV) as Oshino Itsute
One Piece (TV) as Du Feld, Kuni, Daikoku
Ore, Tsushima (TV) as Osamu
Panyo Panyo Di Gi Charat (TV) as Director
Papillon Rose (TV) as Master
Peacemaker Kurogane (TV) as Hajime Saitou 
Real Drive (TV) as Mamoru Aoi
Rizelmine (TV) as Papa C
Sadamitsu the Destroyer (TV) as Detective
Samurai Deeper Kyo (TV) as Saizou Kiragakure
Sh15uya (live-action TV) as Igaya
Shiawase Sou no Okojo-san (TV) as Kitsune-sensei
Shura no Toki (TV) as Miyamoto Musashi
Silent Möbius (TV) as Carua Se; Shiobara
Slayers REVOLUTION (TV) as Duclis
Sol Bianca: The Legacy (OAV) as Auctioneer (Ep 1)
Suzuka as Yoshio Akitsuki
Tales of Hearts as Labrado Arcome
The Demon Girl Next Door Season 2 (TV) as Shirosawa
The Price of Smiles (TV) as Gale Owens
The Prince of Tennis (TV) as Nanijiroh Echizen
The Prince of Tennis: A Day on Survival Mountain (OAV) as Nanijiroh Echizen
Tonkatsu DJ Agetarō (TV) as Gorō Mizokuro
Toriko as Pen (ep 85)
Transformers: Robots in Disguise (TV) as God Magnus
Tsukuyomi -Moon Phase- (TV) as Kinkeru
Ultimate Girls (TV) as Yosaku Okamura
Uzumaki (TV) as Shuichi's Father
Violinist of Hamelin (TV) as Beast King Guitar
You're Under Arrest (TV) as Instructor (ep 4)
You're Under Arrest OVA as Instructor; Lancia Man
Yu-Gi-Oh! Duel Monsters (TV) as Maze Sibling (Older)
Yu-Gi-Oh! Duel Monsters GX (TV) as Gergo
Yu-Gi-Oh! 5D's (TV) as Mizoguchi
Yumeiro Patissiere (TV) as Kazuhiko Kirishima (ep 22)
Zoids Genesis (TV) as Ra-Kan
Zipang as Mamoru Satake

Films
Escaflowne: The Movie as Nukushi
Ghost in the Shell (movie) as Criminal
Beast Wars II The Movie (special) as Gigastorm
Natsume's Book of Friends The Movie: Ephemeral Bond (movie) as One-Eyed Middle Class Yokai
Natsume's Book of Friends: The Waking Rock and the Strange Visitor (movie) as One-Eyed Middle Class Yokai

Live Action Films
The Grudge (live-action movie) as Takeo Saeki
The Grudge 2 (live action movie) as Takeo Saeki
Ju-on: The Grudge (live-action movie) as Takeo Saeki
Heisei Ultraseven as Togo
Kamen Rider Kuuga (live-action TV) as Morimichi Sugita
StrayDog (live-action movie) as Man in White

Video Games
Street Fighter III: 3rd Strike as Oro
Street Fighter V as Necalli and Oro
Warriors Orochi 4 as Zeus

Tokusatsu
Kaitou Sentai Lupinranger VS Keisatsu Sentai Patranger as Jarnake Saucer (ep 38)

Dubbing

Live-action
Aquaman (live-action movie) as King Ricou of the Fishermen (voice-over for Djimon Hounsou)
The Brothers Bloom (live-action movie) as Stephen (voice-over for Mark Ruffalo)
The Crow: Wicked Prayer (live-action movie) as El Niño (voice-over for Dennis Hopper)
Hulk (live-action movie) as Harper (voice-over for Kevin Rankin)
Man of Steel (live-action movie) as Steve Lombard (voice-over for Michael Kelly)
A Mighty Heart (live-action movie) as Mir Zubair Mahmood, East Karachi Deputy Inspector General (voice-over for Irrfan Khan)
Mr. Bean's Holiday (live-action movie) as Mr. Bean (voice-over for Rowan Atkinson)
Speed Racer (live-action movie) as Sparky (voice-over for Kick Gurry)
Super 8 (live-action movie) as Louis Dainard (voice-over for Ron Eldard)
Swordfish (live-action movie) as Axl's lawyer (voice-over for Kirk B.R. Woller)
The Twilight Zone (TV series) as Captain Lane Pendleton (voice-over for Greg Kinnear)
Welcome Home Roscoe Jenkins (live-action movie) as Reggie Jenkins (voice-over for Mike Epps)

Animation
The Powerpuff Girls (TV) as Fuzzy Lumpkins

References

External links 
 

1960 births
Japanese male film actors
Japanese male television actors
Japanese male video game actors
Japanese male voice actors
Living people
People from Tokyo
20th-century Japanese male actors
21st-century Japanese male actors